Petroscirtes variabilis, the variable sabretooth blenny, variable fangblenny, or the variable blenny, is a species of combtooth blenny found in the western Pacific and Indian ocean.  This species reaches a length of  TL.

References

External links
 

variabilis
Fish described in 1849